Sabahattin Kalender (Taşlıca, Kosovo, 15 April 1919 - The Hague, 7 August 2012) was a Turkish composer. His works included the operas Nasrettin Hoca (opera) on the life of Nasreddin, Karagöz Operada and the oratorio Ateş ve İnanç ("Fire and Faith").

His father was a military officer who died in the First World War so Sabahattin was brought up in the Kalender Orphanage Istanbul from which he took his name.

References

Turkish composers
1919 births
2012 deaths